The 75th 24 Hours of Le Mans (French: 75e 24 Heures du Mans) was a 24-hour automobile endurance race for Le Mans Prototype and Grand Touring cars, which took place at the Circuit de la Sarthe, near Le Mans, France, from 16 to 17 June 2007. It was the 75th edition of the event, as organised by the automotive group, the Automobile Club de l'Ouest (ACO) since 1923. Unlike other events, it was not a part of any endurance motor racing championship. A test day was held two weeks prior to the race on 3 June. The event was attended by 250,952 spectators.

The LMP1 class saw the first competition between the new diesel engined Peugeot 908 HDi FAP prototype and the diesel Audi R10 TDI, the  Le Mans winner; the Audi once again achieved an overall victory. There was heavy attrition in the LMP2 class, in which only two competitors finished the race. The GT2 class was a battle between Ferrari and Porsche, won by Porsche.

Background 
The dates for the 2007 24 Hours of Le Mans were confirmed by the Automobile Club de l'Ouest (ACO) in September 2006. It was the 75th edition of the race and occurred at the  Circuit de la Sarthe road racing track close to Le Mans, France, from 16 to 17 June 2007. The race was first held in 1923 after the automotive journalist Charles Faroux, the Automobile Club de l'Ouest (ACO) general secretary Georges Durand and the industrialist Emile Coquile agreed to hold a test of vehicle reliability and durability. It is considered the world's most prestigious sports car race and is part of the Triple Crown of Motorsport.

Track changes
The new corner was moved inward, to create a long flowing curve instead of the single point apex it had been previously, shortening the lap distance by 21 meters to a revised 13.629 km.

Nine new garages were built at the end of the pit lane, replacing the four temporary garages that had been built a few years earlier. The additional garages allowed the ACO to increase the number of entries it could grant from 50 to 55. The paddock behind the garages was also re-organized with more facilities added for spectators, including more shops, new landscaping, and the Audi Tower monument.

The public roads from the Indianapolis corner to the Porsche Curves were re-surfaced. Run-off areas at the Dunlop Chicane, Tertre Rouge, Indianapolis, and Ford Chicanes were also partially asphalted in order to avoid gravel being brought back onto the circuit by cars which had gone off course. This also increased safety by allowing the cars to slow themselves more efficiently using their brakes and tyres on tarmac.

Regulation changes
Rule changes were announced by the ACO for all Le Mans-based series such as the American Le Mans Series, the Le Mans Series, and Japan Le Mans Challenge effective in 2007 for all four classes in October 2006 following close coordination with engineers, fuel companies and manufacturers. LMP2, GT1, and GT2 class vehicles had to be fitted with 5 per cent smaller air restrictors than they had run in 2006, in order to decrease power. Each of the GT1 and GT2 classes were allowed to run ethanol and other alternative fuels if approved by the ACO.

The ACO also imposed Le Mans specific rule changes. All entries had to run Shell fuel in either diesel or petrol form. The ACO would monitor cockpit temperature, and stop any car in which those limits were exceeded. Newer but not older LMP900 and LMP675 class prototypes were allowed to be entered for the event.

It was also decided to begin the event at 3:00 pm local time, one hour earlier than the normal 4:00 pm, to provide French spectators more time to vote in the 17 June French legislative election.

Entries
The ACO's Selection Committee received 76 race entry applications by the 24 January deadline. It reviewed every application and granted 55 invitations to the 24 Hours of Le Mans with entries divided between the LMP1, LMP2, LMGT1 and LMGT2 categories.

Automatic invitations
Automatic entries were earned by teams which won their category in the 2006 24 Hours of Le Mans. Teams which won Le Mans-based series and events such as the 2006 Petit Le Mans, the 2006 Le Mans Series and the 2006 American Le Mans Series were also invited. Some second-place finishers were also granted automatic entries in certain series as well as the third-place LMGT1 finisher of the 2006 Petit Le Mans. Additionally, entries were also granted to the winners and runners-up of the LMGT1 and LMGT2 categories of the 2006 FIA GT Championship under an agreement with the ACO president Claude Plassart, and Stéphane Ratel, the president of the FIA GT Championship organising body, the Stephane Ratel Organisation. As entries were pre-selected to teams, they were restricted to a maximum of two cars and were not allowed to change their vehicles from the previous year to the next. Entries were permitted to change category provided that they did not change the make of car and the ACO granted official permission for the switch.

On 19 January 2007, the ACO announced that 24 of the 28 teams had accepted their automatic entries before the deadline. Penske Racing turned down both of its invitations, and Ray Mallock Ltd. rejected its second entry due to a lack of funding. Vitaphone Racing Team rejected its invitation because its Maserati MC12 did not comply with the ACO's GT1 rules, although the team later attempted to gain entry in another class through application.

List of automatic entries

1. – Team declined their automatic invitations.
2. –  Due to IMSA allowing Aston Martin to run Petit Le Mans below the ACO's minimum weight, their first and second place finishes were not allowed, and automatic entry given to Corvette Racing.
3.  – Corvette Racing had already won two automatic entries, thus the entry was given to Aston Martin.
4.  – Petersen/White Lightning was allowed to participate in Petit Le Mans on a technical waiver. Thus their win was not allowed by the ACO, and automatic entry was given to Risi Competizione.

Official entry list
The ACO published the official entry list on 27 February 2007, which included the full 55 entries and 8 reserves, the largest field since the  edition. Although drivers were not listed, Tom Kristensen's injury in the opening round of the 2007 Deutsche Tourenwagen Masters season made his participation in the race questionable. As the driver with the most wins at Le Mans, he was intended to be part of Audi's factory team. Fellow Audi DTM driver Mattias Ekström was nominated as his possible replacement by Audi. However, on 11 June 2007 Kristensen was cleared by doctors to race, leaving Ekström's services unneeded.

Reserve entries
A total of eight reserve entries were listed by the ACO in its initial published list. Reserves were added to the entry list when a competitor already on the list withdrew. The ACO determined the order in which reserve entries were considered for addition to the entry list.

Two cars officially withdrew from the entry list in April, with their places taken by the following reserve entries. Rollcentre Racing withdrew its LMP2 Radical-Judd entry due to the car being purchased by Embassy Racing on 3 April. The PSI Experience Chevrolet Corvette C6.R was promoted to the race entry as a result. Eight days later, Petersen/White Lightning withdrew its GT2 Ferrari entry had as a consequence of financial strain to the team, leaving it to concentrate solely on the American Le Mans Series. The GPC Sport Ferrari F430 took its place on the entry list.

JMB Racing also withdrew its entry from the reserve list due to its drivers reaching an agreement with AF Corse to run in its entry instead.

Test session

The official test session for Le Mans was held on 3 June, and was the only practice session that was not part of qualifying timing. A total of eight hours of track time was allowed for teams to find their set-ups and for rookie drivers to get in their required ten laps to learn the circuit. Peugeot set the day's pace with a 3 minutes, 26.707 seconds from Sébastien Bourdais in the No. 8 Peugeot 908 HDi FAP with 22 minutes of testing to go. He was one-and-a-half seconds faster than the No. 1 Audi R10 TDI of Frank Biela who was the highest-placed Audi driver in second. Biela was followed by Allan McNish in the sister No. 2 Audi in third who was ahead of Jean-Christophe Boullion's fourth-placed No. 16 Pescarolo 01 car. Jacques Villeneuve put the No. 7 Peugeot in fifth to be the fastest rookie driver over the course of the two sessions.

Michael Vergers' No. 32 Barazi Epsilon car and his teammate Adrián Fernández in the No. 33 entry set identical lap times of 3 minutes, 39.016 seconds to lead the LMP2 category. The third-fastest class time was set by Warren Hughes' No. 40 Quifel ASM Team Racing for Portugal Lola car that had a misfire. In GT1, the No. 63 Corvette driven by Jan Magnussen recorded the fastest time of 3 minutes, 49.207 seconds, followed by the No. 007 Aston Martin of Tomáš Enge and the second factory No. 64 Corvette. Porsche and its new 997s set the first three fastest-laps in the GT2 class. IMSA Performance Matmut's Patrick Long led with a 4 minutes, 1.598 seconds lap, while Autorlando's Allan Simonsen and Johannes van Overbeek of the Flying Lizard team followed behind in second and third positions. The Risi Competizione entry was the fastest Ferrari in fourth place.

Although there were various small incidents, three major accidents led to a red flag for the session. The No. 13 Courage Compétition entry, driven by Guillaume Moreau, went off at the Porsche Curves during the second hour. The car could not return to the test session due a bent chassis caused by the heavy impact. The second red flag involved the No. 24 Noël del Bello entry going off the track at the same location in the hands of Vitaly Petrov, becoming briefly airborne after contact with the concrete wall. In the final incident, almost in the last hour of the session, the No. 10 Arena Motorsports Zytek also went off at the Porsche Curves, and briefly caught fire.

The damage to the Arena Zytek led to the car being withdrawn during scrutineering a week and a half later, just before the actual race. The team decided that it was not able to repair the damage in time for the car to pass scrutineering.

Qualifying
Qualifying was held on 13–14 June, with two two-hour sessions each night; one run at dusk, the other in darkness. New drivers were again required to run a set number of laps to learn the circuit and be allowed to race: three in daylight and three at night. The best overall time from all four sessions determined the starting grid.

Wednesday
The first qualifying session began under the threat of rain, so most of the teams tried to set a good lap time before the conditions deteriorated. The Audis and Peugeots swapped the overall pole position several times, and at the end of the session the No. 1 Audi was fastest overall with a time of 3.28.301. The No. 33 Barazi-Epsilon Zytek led LMP2, after an earlier misfiring problem had been repaired. Oreca's Saleens were the fastest two GT1 cars, while Ferrari and Porsche were close to one another in GT2. The session was red flagged about halfway through because of an accident in which the No. 53 JLOC Lamborghini Murciélago, driven by Marco Apicella, hit the wall at the first Mulsanne chicane. The No. 25 Ray Mallock Ltd. Lola and No. 81 LNT Panoz were the only cars not to set a lap time before the session briefly returned to green as rain began. The ACO extended the session by fifteen minutes to compensate for the earlier red flag.

The second session started several minutes late due to the damp conditions from the earlier rain. A red flag briefly came out for the No. 5 Swiss Spirit Lola a few minutes after the session began due to the car being stopped at the side of the track. Although the track was drying, it was not until the last half hour that teams were able to improve on their first session times. The No. 2 Audi and No. 8 Peugeot swapped the pole position multiple times before the session ended with the No. 8 Peugeot claiming the top position on the final lap of the session with a time of 3:26.344. In GT1 the No. 008 Larbre Aston Martin took the class lead on the final lap with a 3:50.761. The LMP2 and GT2 classes saw very little improvement; the class leading teams remained the same.

It was later announced by the ACO that JLOC Isao Noritake would be allowed to use another Lamborghini Murciélago R-GT chassis, borrowed from the French DAMS team, but Marco Apicella was not allowed to drive in the race due to the head injuries he sustained in his accident during qualifying, leaving the team with two drivers.

Thursday
The first session on Thursday began in heavy rain. Although some cars attempted to carry out wet weather testing, the conditions forced all the teams back to their garages. Once the rain began to slacken off cars returned to the track, but the rain continued throughout the entire session. No one was able to improve on their qualifying times from the previous day.

The rain continued throughout the second session, so most teams concentrated on their wet weather setups in preparation for a wet race. About halfway through the session the No. 7 Peugeot in the hands of Marc Gené missed the turn at Arnage and hit a tire barrier. The car was unable to return to the pits and was taken behind the wall by the marshals. This was soon followed by the No. 73 Luc Alphand Corvette missing the same turn as well, but it continued on without significant damage. The No. 70 PSI Corvette had a minor accident in the last five minutes of the session, bringing out the only red flag of the day and ending all of qualifying.

Audi led the wet sessions with a 4:01.257 time for the No. 1 car, followed by the No. 3 Audi and No. 8 Peugeot within a second. No. 33 Barazi-Epsilon again led the times for the second day in LMP2, while the No. 54 Oreca Saleen continued to show strong pace with the fastest time in GT1. The No. 93 Autorlando Sport Porsche was the fastest GT2 class entry in the rain.

Qualifying times
Class leaders and the fastest lap time on each day are in bold. No cars set a faster time on the second day.

Warm-up 
The drivers took to the track at 09:00 Central European Summer Time (UTC+02:00) for a 45-minute warm-up session, which was used to check car functionality and components on a circuit dampened by overnight rainfall. The No. 8 Peugeot of Bourdais lapped fastest at 4 minutes, 00.830 seconds, ahead of Allan McNish's No. 2 Audi in second and the other Audi of Marco Werner in third. Emmanuel Collard was the highest-placed Pescarolo entry in fourth. The fastest LMP2 time was a 4 minutes, 17.127 seconds from the Barazi Epsilon car driven by Vergers, who was four seconds quicker than RML's No. 25 Lola car used by Thomas Erdos. Oliver Gavin aboard the No. 64 Corvette topped the LMGT1 time sheets from the No. 007 Aston Martin of Enge as Patrick Long's No. 76 IMSA Porsche was fastest in LMGT2.

Race

Start

The race began at 3:00 pm local time (GMT+2), with the track still damp following a wet morning warm-up. It was spectated by 250,952 people. Sébastien Bourdais's Peugeot 908 HDi FAP led the field into the Dunlop Chicane, which he overshot, handing the lead to the No. 2 Audi R10 TDI. The three Audis took over the lead during the opening hour, before pit stops began.

The rebuilt Lamborghini of JLOC Isao Noritake was the first retirement of the race when the gearbox failed on the Mulsanne during its second lap of the race. Shortly after the first hour of the race had been completed, heavy rain resulted in the safety car being brought out again.

Soon after the field was released, the safety car was once again required after an accident in which Mike Rockenfeller spun his No. 3 Audi R10 TDI on the exit from Tertre Rouge, hitting the safety barriers on the Mulsannes Straight backwards.  While crews fixed the barrier, Rockenfeller attempted to repair his Audi, but he was finally forced to retire. This caution period also saw an early retirement for the No. 64 Corvette when a part of its drivetrain broke while following the safety car.  Gavin attempted to return to the pits using battery power but was stopped by the marshals, forcing him to abandon the car. The race eventually continued after nearly an hour under caution.

Night
As dusk began to fall on the drying track, the No. 8 Peugeot suffered from rear wheel hub failures which required two lengthy visits to the garage.
This allowed the No. 1 Audi to take over second place. Jacques Villeneuve's No. 7 Peugeot also lost time, which dropped it to two laps behind the No. 2 Audi. The No. 1 Audi had its own brief moment when the No. 63 Corvette clipped the Audi's rear end. The Corvette was forced to take evasive action through the Dunlop Chicane's gravel trap, and the Audi required replacement rear bodywork on its next pit stop.

A third safety car period was caused by the Creation Autosportif entry, which ran into the tire barriers at the Porsche Curves and needed to be extracted. The Creation returned to the pits but eventually retired. The Kruse Motorsport entry also suffered problems when it briefly stopped at the pit entrance during the caution period, blocking other cars attempting to make their own pit stops. The Kruse entry eventually succeeded in getting to its garage.

As the night continued and the race neared its halfway point, many cars suffered mechanical failures, putting them out of the race. They included a large number of the LMP2 class cars such as Team ASM and Ray Mallock Ltd., both of which had led the class at one point. In GT1, the two factory Aston Martins led the lone remaining factory Corvette by one lap, while the No. 97 Risi Competizione Ferrari had a two-lap lead in the GT2 class.

Morning
In the early hours, fluids were spilled on the track by the leader in GT2, the Risi Competizione Ferrari. This caused numerous competitors to spin, and required the Ferrari to undergo major front-end repairs, resulting in the car falling several laps behind.
 The biggest problem of the morning though occurred shortly before the completion of the 17th hour, when the race-leading No. 2 Audi of Rinaldo Capello lost the left rear wheel at high speed at the Indianapolis corner. Unable to control the car he went straight on into a tire barrier. Although Capello attempted to get the car back to the pits, it was too badly damaged to be drivable. Television footage had recorded the No. 2 Audi being dropped off its airjacks before the left rear wheel was attached on the prior pit stop, but Audi claimed that this was likely not the cause of the wheel coming off at speed.

With two Audis out, this left the lone No. 1 Audi to take over the race lead, with the two Peugeots four and six laps behind respectively. Just before to the No. 2 Audi's accident, the GT1-leading Aston Martin had also come off the track, damaging its front splitter. The necessary repairs led to the car spending eight minutes in the garage, dropping it to fourth in class. The lone factory Corvette gained a place to take over second in class. Scuderia Ecosse's Ferrari briefly took over the GT2 lead after Risi's problems, but it too broke down on the track, handing the lead to the IMSA Performance Matmut Porsche. Binnie Motorsport's entry had a sizable lead in its class, having not suffered the many problems its LMP2 competitors had.

Finish
After having held off for most of the race, the rain began to fall once more during the final three hours. This caused numerous incidents, including the No. 93 Autorlando Porsche missing a Mulsanne chicane and plowing through a temporary tire barrier. The No. 7 Peugeot made an unscheduled garage stop and retired one lap after re-entering the race, claiming oil pressure problems.

The rain eventually became heavier, making the conditions treacherous and bringing the safety car back out. This put a temporary stop to the battle between Aston Martin and Corvette for first and second place in the GT1 class. The second place Corvette had been quicker in the wet conditions, but it was not allowed to further close on the Aston Martin during the safety period. After problems for both of the Barazi-Epsilon LMP2s, Binnie Motorsports brought its class leading LMP2 car to the garage to ensure that the car was prepared for the weather and could hold on to the lead until the finish.

After over an hour behind the safety car, the field was released to race one last time with only twelve minutes remaining. With no close contests between the competitors, the field continued to run at less than racing pace, in preparation for the finish. The No. 8 Peugeot of Sébastien Bourdais briefly went into the pits, before returning to the track. To ensure that the Peugeot finished the race, and did not break down before crossing the finishing line behind the winner, Bourdais stopped at the Ford Chicanes on the final lap. Once the No. 1 Audi had gone past to take the checkered flag, Bourdais restarted the Peugeot and finished as well. The No. 16 Pescarolo finished the race in third, the highest placed petrol car.

The No. 76 IMSA Performance Matmut Porsche was the GT2 winner, with a six lap margin of victory. Only two cars finished in the LMP2 class. The No. 31 Binnie Motorsports Lola took the victory in spite of finishing 18th overall. Of the 54 starters, only 29 cars finished the race. The GT1 class cars proved themselves to be the most reliable, losing only two competitors over the 24 hours.

Official results
Class winners are marked in bold. Cars finishing the race but not completing 75 per cent of the winner's distance are listed as Not Classified (NC).

References

External links

 Official website of the 24 Hours of Le Mans
 Speed Arena – Le Mans 2007
 The-Paddock – 2007 24 Hours of Le Mans
 Racing Sports Cars – Le Mans 24 Hours 2007 (Photo Archive)

Le Mans
2007 in French motorsport
June 2007 sports events in France
2007